André Lardeux (born 22 August 1946) is a French politician and a former member of the Senate of France. He represented the Maine-et-Loire department and is a member of the Union for a Popular Movement Party.

References
Page on the Senate website

1946 births
Living people
French Senators of the Fifth Republic
Union for a Popular Movement politicians
Senators of Maine-et-Loire
Place of birth missing (living people)